The Prince of Murom was the kniaz, the ruler or sub-ruler, of the Rus' Principality of Murom, a lordship based on the city of Murom, now in Vladimir Oblast, Russia.

Gleb Vladimirovich, son of Vladimir the Great, ruled the principality in the early eleventh century. Murom was part of the territory of the Principality of Chernigov in the late eleventh century, controlled by the Sviatoslavichi clan, the descendants of Iaroslav the Wise; probably it was retained by Vsevolod Iaroslavich even after this Prince of Chernigov  became Grand Prince in 1076.

Oleg Sviatoslavich, grandson of Iaroslav and Prince of Chernigov, ruled Murom through a posadnik in the early 1090s, and it was recognised as Oleg's sphere of influence at the Liubech Conference of 1097. Here Oleg's brother Davyd was made co-ruler of Chernigov, and Oleg's lands were parcelled out between Oleg, Davyd and their brother Iaroslav; the latter obtained Ryanzan and Murom.

In 1392 Vasily Dmitr'evich, Prince of Moscow and Grand Prince of Vladimir, obtained a patent from Khan Tokhtamysh authorising the annexation of the Murom principality, along with those of Nizhni Novgorod and Gorodets.

List of princes of Murom
 Iaroslav Sviatoslavich, 1097–1129
 Iurii Iaroslavich, 1129–1143
 Sviatoslav Iaroslavich, 1143–1145
 Rostislav Iaroslavich, 1145–1147
 Vladimir Sviatoslavich, 1147–1149
 Rostislav Iaroslavich (again), 1149–1155
 Vladimir Sviatoslavich (again), 1155–1161
 Iurii Vladimirovich, 1161–1174
 Vladimir Yuryevich, ?–1203
 Davyd Yuryevich, 1203–1228
 Iurii Davydovich, ?–1237
 Igor Yuryevich, 1203–?
 Iaroslav Yuryevich, 1237–?

After Iaroslav and the destruction of Murom by the Mongols, the princes of Murom disappeared for nearly a century, resuming with:
 Vasily Iaroslavich, ?–1344 x 8
 Iurii Iaroslavich, 1344 x 8–1353
 Fedor Glebovich, 1353–x 1392

Notes

References
 Dimnik, Martin, The Dynasty of Chernigov, 1146–1246, (Cambridge, 2003)
 Franklin, Simon, and Shepard, Jonathan, The Emergence of Rus, 750–1200, (Longman History of Russia, Harlow, 1996)
 Martin, Janet, Medieval Russia, 980–1584, (Cambridge, 1995)

Noble titles of Kievan Rus